Nofit (lit. Scenic) is a community settlement in northern Israel. Located in the Lower Galilee, it falls under the jurisdiction of Zevulun Regional Council.

History
The beginnings of the village were with a group of eight families from Haifa and the Kerayot who were interested in establishing a community settlement in the Galilee. The initiator of the idea and the organizer of the group was Architect Zvi (Tzibi) Springer who planned the village with a sustainable vision. The initiative was co-ordinated with the state, who approved the idea in 1982. Work on the infrastructure began in 1984, whilst the building of homes began in April 1986. The first residents (179 families) moved in on 9 November 1987. The village was initially named Pi Ner after Ludwig Piner, the head of Rassco, though it was later changed to Nofit.

References

External links
Village website 

Community settlements
Populated places established in 1987
1987 establishments in Israel
Populated places in Haifa District